Antal von Kánya (6 September 1893 – 9 March 1967) was a Hungarian equestrian. He competed in two events at the 1928 Summer Olympics.

References

1893 births
1967 deaths
Hungarian male equestrians
Olympic equestrians of Hungary
Equestrians at the 1928 Summer Olympics
Sportspeople from Győr